Sulejman Pasha of Uskoplje (1804–1816) was an Ottoman Bosnian military commander and governor active in Rumelia (the Balkans), who distinguished himself fighting Serb rebels in the 1800s and 1810s. He served as the first Vizier of Belgrade (the Sanjak of Smederevo) after crushing the First Serbian Uprising (1804–1813).

Origin
Sulejman hailed from Uskoplje, a town near Bugojno in central Bosnia. According to Sulejman's great-grandson, the poet Omer-beg Sulejmanpašić (1870–1918), the family originated from Mihailo, a Bosnian nobleman that held the fort of Vesela Straža, then after the Ottoman conquest converted into Islam, becoming Ali Pasha (Ali-paša).

Career
 
The First Serbian Uprising broke out in the Sanjak of Smederevo (today central Serbia) in 1804, and echoed in other Serb-inhabited lands in the Ottoman Empire. After the Drobnjak Rebellion broke out in March 1805, and expanded in the eastern Sanjak of Herzegovina (now in Montenegro), the Ottoman government sent Sulejman Pasha in the beginning of October to suppress it. Suleiman Pasha was one of the most courageous and resolute Ottoman commanders at that time. By January 1806, the Drobnjak rebellion was suppressed, and Sulejman Pasha had the rebel leaders punished, and forced the population of Drobnjak and Morača to pay tribute. In March 1806, Suleiman Pasha defeated the Serbian rebel band of Radič Petrović near the Studenica Monastery. He commanded the Ottoman army sent from Bosnia that was decisively defeated at Mišar by the Serbian rebels in August 1806. After the defeat, he retreated to Šabac, but was forced to hand over the town to Karađorđe, the leader of the Serbian Uprising, in February 1807. In the Ottoman campaign in Serbia in 1813, Suleiman commanded part of the forces that took Loznica, and also participated in the battle of Ravnje, in which he was wounded, at the end of August. After the Ottoman suppression of the First Serbian Uprising (by October 1813), Suleiman was appointed the Vizier of Belgrade (the Sanjak of Smederevo). The Ottoman atrocities against the Serb population sparked Hadži Prodan's Revolt (1814), which was violently suppressed by Suleiman. The Second Serbian Uprising broke out in 1815, and after Sulejman was unable to suppress it, his forces having suffered heavy defeats in the battles of Palež, Čačak and Požarevac, and generally failing in restoring order in the Belgrade Pashalik, he was replaced by Marashli Ali Pasha and transferred to Bosnia.

References

Sources

19th-century Ottoman military personnel
Governors of the Ottoman Empire
Ottoman Bosnian nobility
People of the First Serbian Uprising
People of the Second Serbian Uprising
18th-century births
1820s deaths